GFHA could refer to:

 Georgia Field Hockey Association 
 Greater Flint Hockey Association
 Hastings Airport (Sierra Leone) in Freetown, Sierra Leone (ICAO identifier: GFHA)